Home Shanti is an Indian Hindi-language family comedy drama web series written and directed by Akanksha Dua. The series premiered on 6 May 2022 on Disney+ Hotstar. It stars Supriya Pathak, Manoj Pahwa, Chakori Dwivedi and Poojan Chhabra.

Plot
A middle class Joshi family wants to build a house of their own in Dehradun area. The series talks about the ups and downs the family faces during the construction of their dream house.

Reception
Reviewers praised the acting of Manoj Pahwa and Supriya Pathak, and called the series as a whole "relatable and mildly amusing" (Indian Express) and "trapped within the four walls of averageness" (NDTV).

Cast
 Supriya Pathak as Sarla Joshi
 Manoj Pahwa as Umesh Joshi Sujan
 Chakori Dwivedi as Jigyasa Joshi
 Poojan Chhabra as Naman Joshi
 Happy Ranajit as Pappu Pathak
 Arnav Bhasin as inexperienced architect in Episode 2
 Nidhi Bisht as SDM in Episode 4
 Biswapati Sarkar as Corrupt government officer in Episode 4
 Rakesh Bedi in Episode 5
 Sameer Saxena as Poet Muradabadi in Episode 5
 Neha Tomar as Akshara Mehta
 Amarjeet Singh as Shankar Dhoni
 Neelu Dogra as Gulatan
 Yamini Singh as Mehtan

Episodes

References

External links
 

Hindi-language web series
2022 Indian television series debuts